The Iranian International Championships  also known as the Iran International was a mens clay court tennis tournament founded in 1966. It was first held in Opt Esteghlal Tennis Club, Tehran, Iran. The tournament ran until 1970 then was discontinued.

History
In 1937 the Iranian Tennis Federation was founded. In 1948 Iran was admitted as a full member of the International Lawn Tennis Federation. In 1966 the first leading open international tournament was established the Iranian International Championships. The championships were usually held in September until 1970.

References

Clay court tennis tournaments
Defunct tennis tournaments in Iran